Seemanta Mahavidyalaya (SMV), Jharpokharia is a constituent college of North Orissa University, Baripada situated 25 km from the heart of Mayurbhanj. The college provides leducation in science, commerce and arts stream to +2 science(Intermediate), Bachelor in science (BSc.) and arts (BA.) & vocational courses. Affiliation was obtained from Utkal University in 1980-81 for opening of intermediate class in Arts.

Notable alumni

See also 
 University Grants Commission (India)
 Education in India
 Universities and colleges in India
 North Orissa University
 National Accreditation and Assessment Council 
 Seemanta Engineering College

References

External links 
 Seemanta Mahavidyalaya website

Universities and colleges in Odisha
Mayurbhanj district
Educational institutions established in 1979
1979 establishments in Orissa